Merrol Hyde Magnet School (MHMS) is a K–12 school in Hendersonville, Tennessee adhering to the Paideia philosophy and administered by the Sumner County Board of Education. It is the only magnet school in Sumner County. The school's motto is "Mandatus ad virtutem," or "Committed to excellence." Merrol Hyde is ranked first in Tennessee and seventh in the nation by USNews.

History 
MHMS was established in 2003 on the former Indian burial ground, next to the local plantation. The school is named after Merrol N. Hyde, a local resident and Sumner County Commissioner. The school served grades 5–9 in its first school year. The second school year, 2004–05, the school had students in grades K–10 with the addition of a new elementary wing. The 2005–06 school year served grades K–11. The 2006–07 school year brought the first ever graduating class of MHMS. There were 57 college-bound graduates in the class of 2007. In 2013, Vice Principal Betty Hunter was replaced by Jason Bennett. Principal Brad Schreiner was replaced in 2014 by Todd Stinson. Darren Frank has served as the principal since 2016. Jen Teachenor has served as Vice Principal since 2021.

On May 9, 2018, a chemical flash fire injured seventeen students and a teacher. The fire was caused by a reaction between Borax and ethanol. Eight students and the teacher were treated in local hospitals, but no critical injuries were reported. Two separate lawsuits were filed against the school district, citing negligence.

In April 2020, Merrol Hyde was ranked third in the nation on an academic basis by US News. This is its highest rank-based achievement to date. The ranking was awarded based on high college readiness, high math and reading proficiency, a consistent 100% graduation rate, and student performance on standardized tests, including AP, ACT, and SAT scores.

Admittance 
Admittance to the school is selective. Once an application is submitted, the prospective student is administered a standardized test. In order to gain entry into the school, the student must score in at least the 85th percentile. After this, the student is placed on a waiting list. The acceptance priorities are as follows.

1st: People who have siblings in the school are accepted first.

2nd: The people that got the highest scores will be placed further near the top.

There are waiting lists for most every grade in the school. If at any point during the school year, a student leaves, then the first person on the waiting list will be contacted. If he/she is unavailable to join Merrol Hyde, then it goes to the 2nd person and so on.

Academics
Merrol Hyde is dedicated to helping its students grow through the Paideia philosophy. In the school's first twelve graduating classes, it has had multiple students obtain perfect ACT scores, finalist status in prestigious academic programs such as the National Merit Scholarship Program and the Presidential Scholars Program. Merrol Hyde students have been admitted to Yale University, Princeton University, Vanderbilt University, Duke University, Emory University, Georgetown University, and Tulane University, among others. The school has also produced several nationally ranked BEST Robotics, DECA, quiz bowl, and history bowl teams. Each year, the school participates in the Model United Nations and Tennessee Youth in Government youth civic engagement programs.

Clubs and activities 

Merrol Hyde offers numerous clubs, activities, and student organizations. Among these are its band, pep band, and jazz ensemble, as well as DECA participation, a government club, a student council, a culinary club, the Fellowship of Christian Athletes, the National Honor Society, a math team, the Gay-Straight Alliance, and Med-Connect. The school offers a yearbook club and a student-written circulated newspaper known as The Talon. Students have also created a Rubik's Cube club and a Super Smash Bros. Ultimate club.

High school students participate in "Pillar Competitions" known as the Panhellenic Cup, which are games and tournaments between four student-led teams. These teams are Apollo, Artemis, Athena, and Poseidon, referencing Greek mythology. Students compete in athletic and academic activities, such as recycling, field day, "Greek Week" dress-up days, sporting events, and games. Middle School students compete in a similar student body-wide competition, known as Order of Heroes. During Homecoming Week every January, high school students celebrate the basketball teams and compete against each other in grade-based competitions.

Athletics 
TSSAA sports include track, cross country, golf, tennis, soccer, football (varsity joins with Station Camp High School), basketball, swimming, volleyball, bowling. The school also offers archery, cheer-leading, dance team, cycling, and a personal fitness club. Each student in grades 7-12 is required to participate in a sport each year.

Dress code 
Apart from other Sumner County Schools, Merrol Hyde Magnet School adheres to a strict dress code. Grades K–12 must wear specific style numbers of a very limited selection of garments from Lands' End, French Toast, or Parker School Uniforms.  Logo hoodies, athletic wear, and pullovers may only be purchased from the "Hawk Shop." No non-dress code outerwear may be worn in the building during the day. Girls may not wear skirts that end more than 3 inches from the bend in the back of the knee. Other elements of the dress code include a requirement of belts, a ban on shoes without backs in the middle school ref>https://mhm.sumnerschools.org/images/docs/2019/K-5_Dress_Code.pdf </ref>

See also

Sumner County Schools
Exceptional education
Magnet Schools of America
Public education
Selective school

References

External links 
Official website

Educational institutions established in 2003
Magnet schools in Tennessee
Schools in Sumner County, Tennessee
Public high schools in Tennessee
Public middle schools in Tennessee
Public elementary schools in Tennessee
2003 establishments in Tennessee